Vladimir Stupishin (27 November 1932 – 23 December 2016) was a Russian diplomat who served as Russia's first Ambassador to Armenia from April 1992 until September 1994 following the break-up of the Soviet Union.

Stupishin died on 23 December 2016, at the age of 84.

References

1932 births
2016 deaths
Ambassador Extraordinary and Plenipotentiary (Russian Federation)
Ambassadors of Russia to Armenia